Hierodoris tygris, also known as the Titirangi Tyger, is a species of moth in the family Oecophoridae. It is endemic to New Zealand and is found in the Auckland  and Wellington regions. The larvae of this species is unknown as are the larval host species. Adults have been found on the wing from December to March with one specimen collected in early May. It is a nocturnal species that is attracted to light and has been collected with the use of a mercury vapour lamp. This species is classified as "Not Threatened" by the Department of Conservation.

Taxonomy
This species was first described by Robert J. B. Hoare in 2005 and named Hierodoris tygris. The holotype specimen, which was collected by Hoare at Minnehaha Ave in Titirangi on 7 January 2000, is held at the New Zealand Arthropod Collection. The species was first collected in December 1953 by C. R. Thomas. In 1971 it was again collected by M. J. Meads at the Ōrongorongo Research Station but was misidentified.

Description
 
The wingspan of the male of the species is between 16 to18 mm. mm and the female is between 17 and 22 mm. This species has a unique striped coloration to its forewings and this ferruginous colour and pattern, along with the lack of eyespot on the forewings are diagnostic for the identification of the species.

Distribution

This species is endemic to New Zealand. It can only be found in the Auckland  and Wellington regions. Other than the type locality of Titirangi, this species has been collected at Clevedon, at Murphy's Bush in Manurewa, at Cascades Park in the Waitākere Ranges, and in the Ōrongorongo Valley in Wellington.

Biology and behaviour 
Little is known of the biology of H. tygris. The larvae of this species is unknown. It has been hypothesised that the larvae of H. tygris are canopy feeders. The species has been found on the wing from December to March with one specimen collected in early May. It is a nocturnal species that is attracted to light and has been collected with the use of a mercury vapour lamp.

Host species and habitat 
The host species for the larvae of H. tygis is unknown. It has been hypothesised that the host species is Dacrydium cupressinum (rimu).

Conservation status 
This species has been classified as having the "Not Threatened" conservation status under the New Zealand Threat Classification System.

References

Oecophoridae
Moths described in 2005
Moths of New Zealand
Endemic fauna of New Zealand
Taxa named by Robert Hoare
Endemic moths of New Zealand